The 1981 Cal State Hayward Pioneers football team represented California State University, Hayward—now known as California State University, East Bay—as a member of the Far Western Conference (FWC) during the 1981 NCAA Division II football season. Led by seventh-year head coach Tim Tierney, Cal State Hayward compiled an overall record of 6–4–1 with a mark of 4–1 in conference play, sharing the FWC title with UC Davis. The team outscored its opponents 201 to 135 for the season. The Pioneers played home games at Pioneer Stadium in Hayward, California.

Schedule

References

Cal State Hayward
Cal State Hayward Pioneers football seasons
Northern California Athletic Conference football champion seasons
Cal State Hayward Pioneers football